Finland sent 33 athletes to the 1978 European Athletics Championships which took place 29 August–3 September 1978 in Prague. Finland won six medals at the Championships.

Medalists

References 

Nations at the 1978 European Athletics Championships
1978
1978 in Finnish sport